Greatest Hits Live is a live album by Ace Frehley. The album contains ten live tracks and two studio recordings. Tracks 1-6, 8 and 10 were recorded in London, England. Tracks 7 and 9 were recorded in Chicago, Illinois. The final two studio recordings were outtakes from Frehley's previous greatest hits compilation, Loaded Deck.

Track listing

Personnel
 Ace Frehley - guitar, vocals, producer
 John Regan - bass, vocals
 Tod Howarth - guitar, vocals
 Jamie Oldaker - drums, percussion
 Anton Fig - drums, percussion
 Frank Simms - vocals
 David Spinner - vocals
 Richie Scarlett - guitar, vocals
 Peter Criss - drums, percussion
 Sebastian Bach - vocals
 Rachel Bolan - vocals
 Peppy Castro - vocals
 Al Frisch - vocals
 Pat Sommers - vocals
 Eddie Kramer - producer, mixer
 David Cook - mixer
 John Regan - mixer

References

External links
, Accessed on May 3, 2008.

Ace Frehley live albums
Albums produced by Eddie Kramer
Albums produced by John Regan
2006 live albums
2006 compilation albums
Megaforce Records live albums